Palos Verdes Golf Club is a private golf and social club on the West coast of the United States, located in Palos Verdes Estates, California, a suburb southwest of Los Angeles.

History
The golf course design began in 1923, and the course was opened in 1924. The club, an amenity for area residents in the newly developed Palos Verdes Project, was designed by Olmsted Brothers together with the architects George C. Thomas and William P. Bell. Many varieties of trees were planted during original construction, which are now very mature and line and narrow the fairways. The land on which the course is situated is owned by the City of Palos Verdes Estates, and the club is operated under a concession agreement with the city.

The clubhouse underwent a major remodel from 2005–2007 and is a popular venue for weddings, with expansive views of the Pacific Ocean and variable capacity.

General information
The greens at Palos Verdes are a mixture of Poa annua and bent grass, and the fairways are kikuyu grass. The course has much change in elevation, and can be difficult for some players to walk. Guests may play the course with a member, or may pay a public rate of $275 with highly restricted non-member tee times available. For the dress code, denim is not allowed; a tucked-in collared shirt, belt, and slacks or Bermuda shorts are required, as are soft spikes.

Membership is generally restricted to residential property owners in the city of Palos Verdes Estates, and is open to residents of neighboring cities only by sponsorship from an existing member, and when no residents are on the waiting list. Nonresidents of Palos Verdes Estates additionally pay a higher entrance fee. Over the last few years, the waiting list for membership has shortened, allowing residents to join quickly and nonresidents to join within one year.

The club is the site of the annual Northrop Grumman Regional Challenge - an invitational tournament for the top NCAA women's golf teams in the country. In 2022, it hosted the inaugural edition of the LPGA Tour's Palos Verdes Championship.

The course
The men's slope ratings are 72.3/133, 71.2/130 and 68.9/124 for the black, blue, and white tees, respectively.

While not considered lengthy at just under 6,500 yards, the architects' use of the natural terrain, barrancas, creeks, and hills, combined with small greens, extensive bunkering, narrow fairways with strategically designed landing areas, and prevailing westerly ocean breezes, the course presents a challenge for players of all levels. Members have taken great care in preserving the original design and routing of this masterpiece. As of July 2013, the course underwent a fresh $1.5M renovation, restoring some of the lost hole design features and removing hundreds of trees to open up ocean views, and adding modern chipping areas around most greens.

A number of the holes (1, 2, 3, 6, 12, 13, 14) play long, as they are into the prevailing west wind from the Pacific Ocean,  less than a mile from the course. Fourteen of the course's eighteen holes feature panoramic views of the Pacific Ocean (a Thomas trademark).

The front nine is a "perfect nine" - where no two holes in a row are of the same par.

The course record post-renovation (black tees) is 61; the long-standing record from the blue tees pre-2013 is 59.

Scorecard

References

External links
 Official site
 Course blog

Golf clubs and courses in California
Landmarks in Los Angeles
Clubs and societies in the United States